Ust-Ordynsky (Ordyn Adag) is a rural locality (a settlement) and the administrative center of Ekhirit-Bulagatsky District of Ust-Orda Buryat Okrug in Irkutsk Oblast, Russia, as well as the administrative center of Ust-Orda Buryat Okrug. Population:

References

Rural localities in Irkutsk Oblast